This is a list of Nigerian films scheduled for theatrical release in 2016.

2016

January–March

April–June

See also
2016 in Nigeria
List of Nigerian films

References

External links
2016 films at the Internet Movie Database

2016
Lists of 2016 films by country or language
Films